Brigitte Lin Ching-hsia (born 3 November 1954) is a Taiwanese actress. She is regarded as an icon of Chinese language cinema for her extensive and varied roles in both Taiwanese and Hong Kong films.

Biography 
Lin was born in Chiayi, Taiwan. She was scouted in 1972 on the streets of Taipei by a film producer after she finished women's high school and was preparing for university. Lin debuted in the film adaptation of Chiung Yao's Outside the Window (1973), which propelled her into stardom. Lin, along with Joan Lin, Charlie Chin and Chin Han, thus became known as the "Two Chins, Two Lins" (二秦二林) for their extensive roles in romantic movies of the 1970s based on Chiung's novels that dominated the Taiwanese box office. She subsequently joined Chiung Yao's company in 1976 and, by 1982, had played the lead in 12 of her films.

Lin won the Best Actress award at the Asia-Pacific Film Festival for her role as a girl scout in Eight Hundred Heroes (1976).

After having worked on more than 50 films within the first seven years of her career, Lin took a hiatus from acting in 1979 and moved to the US for a year and a half.

Known for being a "screen goddess" by Chinese film lovers, Lin's early collaborations with Hong Kong New Wave directors Ringo Lam, Tsui Hark and Jackie Chan in Love Massacre (1981), Zu Warriors from the Magic Mountain (1983), Police Story (1985) and Peking Opera Blues (1986) brought her success. In 1990, she won the Best Actress trophy at the 27th Golden Horse Awards for her depiction of a Chinese female writer who fell in love with a Japanese collaborator in Red Dust (1990).

It was common for women to cross dress as male characters in Chinese movies and operas. And Lin is particularly well known for her androgynous roles, her earliest being Jia Baoyu, the male protagonist of the 1977 film adaptation of Dream of the Red Chamber. In Peking Opera Blues (1986), she was a guerrilla revolutionary and in Royal Tramp II (1992), she was the leader of the Heavenly Dragon Sect, both of whom were women characters dressed as men. And in Ashes of Time (1994), she played twin brother/sister duo Yin and Yang. However, she is perhaps most well known for her role as Dongfang Bubai in Swordsman II (1992). Swordsman II marked the peak of her career in terms of box office earnings for which she was listed among the 10 greatest performances in cinema of all time, by Time magazine.

Subsequently, she starred in many other notable martial epics including New Dragon Gate Inn (1992) and The Bride with White Hair (1993).

At the height of her popularity, Lin was one of the most sought-after actresses in the Chinese film industry. She starred in more than 100 movies. Lin was credited for boosting Taiwan's film production in the 1970s before earning even greater popularity in Hong Kong in the 1990s, becoming a trans-island legend of her time.

She retired from acting in 1994. Her last acting role was in Ashes of Time (1994).

Personal life
Lin traces her family roots to Shandong, China.

It's been reported that Lin has dated both Chin Han and Charlie Chin of "Two Chins, Two Lins" back in the 1970s, even sustaining a proposal from the latter before eventually cancelling it.

Lin married Hong Kong businessman Michael Ying in 1994. She is the mother of Eileen Ying Oi Lum (born 1996) and Melani Ying Yin-oi (born 2001) and stepmother to Claudine Ying.

She made her first public appearance since her marriage at the screening of Ashes of Time Redux during the 2008 New York Film Festival.

In 2015, Lin made an appearance as a regular cast member in Up Idol, a 12 episode Chinese reality show on Hunan Television.

Filmography

Awards and nominations

Related publications
 The Last Star of the East: Brigitte Lin Ching Hsia and Her Films (2005)
 窗裏窗外 Inside and Outside the Window (2011)
 雲去雲來 Cloud Goes, Cloud Comes (2014)

References

External links

 
 
 

1954 births
Hong Kong people of Taiwanese descent
Living people
Actresses from Taipei
Taiwanese Buddhists
Taiwanese film actresses
20th-century Taiwanese actresses
21st-century Taiwanese actresses